Andra Fuller (born May 29, 1979 in Houston, Texas) is an American actor and stand-up comedian, best known for his role in The CW drama series The L.A. Complex.

Early life 
The youngest of three siblings, he was educated at Baylor University where he was President of Alpha Phi Alpha Fraternity.

Career 
Fuller has described the pinnacle of his stand-up career as performing at the Apollo Theater in Harlem, New York; moving to Los Angeles in 2008, however, he found far less opportunity for his work as a comedian. Instead, he enjoys work in dramatic roles on the big screen, television and stage with projects like The Game, You Can't Fight Christmas, Another Man Will, True to the Game, Love by the 10th Date, Deuces and The LA Complex. 
Apart from The L.A. Complex, he has worked on Black&Sexy TV, Issa Rae's Roomieloverfriends, and Aaron McGruder's comedy series, Black Jesus, which attracted criticism for its depiction of Christ in a twentieth-century inner city environment. Fuller responded to this criticism by claiming that it outweighed "how much heart the show has,"' Most recently he has appeared in Here We Go Again on TVOne.

Personal life 
Fuller resides in Los Angeles.

Filmography

Films/Movie

Television series

Awards and nominations

References

External links

 

1979 births
Living people
Baylor University alumni
Male actors from Houston
Comedians from Texas
21st-century American comedians